Serten may refer to:

 Atenolol, a beta blocker drug, trade name Serten
 Serten (Greyhawk), a character in the Greyhawk Dungeons & Dragons setting